Hyampom Airport  is a county-owned public-use airport and residential airpark located one mile (2 km) northwest of the central business district of Hyampom, a town in Trinity County, California, United States, and bordering the South Fork Trinity River on its west side.

Facilities and aircraft 
For the 12-month period ending December 31, 2005, the airport had 2,000 general aviation aircraft operations, an average of 5 per day.

References

External links 
Trinity County Airports: Hyampom

Airports in Trinity County, California
Residential airparks